Murray McDowell (born 17 February 1978) is a Scottish  former professional footballer. He played in the Scottish Football League First Division for Partick Thistle and Clyde.

Career
A striker, McDowell started his professional career at Cowdenbeath. He had an impressive time at Cowdenbeath and received offers from Hearts, Southend United and Brentford. McDowell eventually joined Partick Thistle in August 2001. Despite scoring on his debut for the Jags, he failed to make a breakthrough at the club.

After leaving Thistle, McDowell had brief spells at Queen of the South, Clyde, Arbroath and Stenhousemuir.

McDowell moved into junior football with Carnoustie Panmure in 2004 and went on to play for numerous clubs at this level including Linlithgow Rose, Tayport and Kelty Hearts. He moved into his first management role at Jeanfield Swifts in 2009 and later had spells in charge at Luncarty and Kinnoull.

McDowell is a certified personal fitness trainer, working for Good Health in Dundee.

McDowell was appointed manager of East Superleague side Camelon Juniors in June 2016 but left the post three months later.

References

External links

1978 births
Living people
Footballers from Dundee
Berwick Rangers F.C. players
Clyde F.C. players
Scottish Junior Football Association players
Partick Thistle F.C. players
Association football forwards
Scottish footballers
Scottish Football League players
Cowdenbeath F.C. players
Queen of the South F.C. players
Arbroath F.C. players
Stenhousemuir F.C. players
Carnoustie Panmure F.C. players
Bathgate Thistle F.C. players
Linlithgow Rose F.C. players
Luncarty F.C. players
Tayport F.C. players
Kelty Hearts F.C. players
Jeanfield Swifts F.C. players
Oakley United F.C. players
Ballingry Rovers F.C. players
Scottish football managers
Dundee F.C. non-playing staff